Abdeslam Bousri (born 28 January 1953) is an Algeria international former football forward who played for MC Alger.

Honours 
 Won the African Champions League once with MC Alger in 1976
 Won the Algerian League 5 times with MC Alger in 1972, 1975, 1976, 1978 and 1979
 Won the Algerian Cup 3 times with MC Alger in 1973, 1976 and 1983
 Finished as the top scorer of the Algerian League 4 times with MC Alger in 1978 (14 goals), 1979 (11 goals), 1982 (16 goals) and 1983 (19 goals)

References

External links
 

1953 births
Living people
Algerian footballers
Algeria international footballers
Algeria youth international footballers
MC Alger players
Footballers from Algiers
Competitors at the 1979 Mediterranean Games
Mediterranean Games bronze medalists for Algeria
Mediterranean Games medalists in football
Association football forwards
21st-century Algerian people
20th-century Algerian people